The 2020 Virginia Tech Hokies football team represented Virginia Tech during the 2020 NCAA Division I FBS football season. The Hokies were led by fifth-year head coach Justin Fuente and played their home games at Lane Stadium in Blacksburg, Virginia, competing as members of the Atlantic Coast Conference (ACC).

After completing their regular season with a 5–6 record (5–5 in ACC play), the program announced on December 16 that players had voted to end their season and would not consider a bid to a bowl game. The Hokies had appeared in a bowl game for 27 consecutive seasons, dating back to the 1993 Independence Bowl. This was fourth-longest streak of consecutive bowl game appearances in college football history.

Coaching staff

Schedule
Virginia Tech had games scheduled against Liberty, Middle Tennessee, North Alabama, and Penn State, which were all canceled due to the COVID-19 pandemic.

The ACC released their schedule on July 29, with specific dates selected at a later date.

Schedule Source:

Game summaries

NC State

at Duke

at North Carolina

Boston College

at Wake Forest

at Louisville

Liberty

Miami (FL)

at Pittsburgh

Clemson

Virginia

Rankings

2021 NFL Draft

References

Virginia Tech
Virginia Tech Hokies football seasons
Virginia Tech Hokies football